Gilgit Valley is a valley located in Gilgit District in Gilgit-Baltistan, northern Pakistan. The Gilgit River flows through the valley. 375 km of road connects it to the town of Chitral via the Shandur Pass (3,800 m).

The town of Gilgit lies in the valley.

References 
Valleys of Gilgit-Baltistan

ur:گلگت